Hendra Wijaya (born 27 December 1985) is a Singaporean badminton player. Wijaya and his brother, Hendri Saputra, joined the Singapore Badminton Association (SBA) in 2000 and both became Singapore citizens after five years.

Achievements

Commonwealth Games 
Men's doubles

Southeast Asian Games 
Men's doubles

World Junior Championships 
Boys' singles

Asian Junior Championships 
Boys' singles

BWF Grand Prix 
The BWF Grand Prix had two levels, the BWF Grand Prix and Grand Prix Gold. It was a series of badminton tournaments sanctioned by the Badminton World Federation (BWF) which was held from 2007 to 2017. The World Badminton Grand Prix has been sanctioned by the International Badminton Federation from 1983 to 2006.

Men's doubles

Mixed doubles

  BWF Grand Prix Gold tournament
  BWF & IBF Grand Prix tournament

BWF International Challenge/Series 
Men's singles

Men's doubles

Mixed doubles

  BWF International Challenge tournament
  BWF International Series tournament
  BWF Future Series tournament

References

External links 
 

Living people
1985 births
Indonesian male badminton players
Indonesian emigrants to Singapore
Naturalised citizens of Singapore
Singaporean male badminton players
Badminton players at the 2006 Commonwealth Games
Badminton players at the 2010 Commonwealth Games
Commonwealth Games bronze medallists for Singapore
Commonwealth Games medallists in badminton
Badminton players at the 2006 Asian Games
Asian Games competitors for Singapore
Competitors at the 2007 Southeast Asian Games
Competitors at the 2009 Southeast Asian Games
Competitors at the 2015 Southeast Asian Games
Competitors at the 2017 Southeast Asian Games
Southeast Asian Games silver medalists for Singapore
Southeast Asian Games bronze medalists for Singapore
Southeast Asian Games medalists in badminton
Medallists at the 2010 Commonwealth Games